"Every Rose Has Its Thorn" is a power ballad by American glam metal band Poison. It was released in October 1988 as the third single from Poison's second album Open Up and Say... Ahh!. The band's  signature song, it is also their only number-one hit in the US, reaching the top spot on December 24, 1988, for three weeks. It also charted at number 11 on the Mainstream Rock chart. It was a number 13 hit in the UK. "Every Rose Has Its Thorn" was named number 34 on VH1's "100 Greatest Songs of the 80s", number 100 on their "100 Greatest Love Songs" and number seven on MTV and VH1 "Top 25 Power Ballads". Billboard ranked the song number five on their list of "The 10 Best Poison Songs".

Background and writing
In an interview with VH1's Behind the Music, Bret Michaels said the inspiration for the song came from a night when he was in a laundromat in Dallas  waiting for his clothes to dry, and called his girlfriend on a pay phone. Michaels said he heard a male voice in the background and was devastated; he said he went into the laundromat and wrote "Every Rose Has Its Thorn" as a result.

Critical reception
Jerry Smith, reviewer of British music newspaper Music Week, described this song as "over-wrought ballad, but it makes a change from their ponderous metal posturing".  Cash Box said that "Poison slows it down with a bevy of acoustic guitars, and deliver a well-measured ballad."

Music video
The music video to "Every Rose Has Its Thorn" was directed by Marty Callner. It starts out with a forlorn Bret Michaels in bed with a young woman, they both look unhappy. He gets up, does the heavy sigh that is at the start of the song and walks away to play the acoustic guitar, the video then goes into video clips of the band's tour. The same young woman is seen driving a Thunderbird in the rain (two different times), listening to "Every Rose Has Its Thorn" on the car's radio. The video was shot at the Brown County Veterans Memorial Arena in Green Bay, Wisconsin, and in an empty warehouse nearby. The video ends with Michaels playing the last of the song on his acoustic guitar and walking away.

Legacy
The song has been seen as a glam metal classic, being ranked on multiple "best of" lists. In 2017, Billboard and OC Weekly ranked the song number five and number two, respectively, on their lists of the 10 greatest Poison songs.

Charts

Weekly charts

Year-end charts

All-time charts

Certifications

Cover versions
American recording artist Miley Cyrus recorded a version of the song for her 2010 album Can't Be Tamed.
In early 2013, composer Bret Michaels recorded a duet with the country music singer Loretta Lynn. It can be found on his album Jammin' with Friends. He performed an acoustic version in the episode "Happy Endings" of TV series Revolution.[

References

1980s ballads
1988 singles
1988 songs
Billboard Hot 100 number-one singles
Bret Michaels songs
Cashbox number-one singles
Capitol Records singles
Glam metal ballads
Hollywood Records singles
Miley Cyrus songs
Music videos directed by Marty Callner
Poison (American band) songs
Song recordings produced by Tom Werman
Songs about flowers
Songs about heartache
Songs written by Bobby Dall
Songs written by Bret Michaels
Songs written by C.C. DeVille
Songs written by Rikki Rockett